The 2015–16 Milwaukee Panthers men's basketball team represented the University of Wisconsin–Milwaukee during the 2015–16 NCAA Division I men's basketball season. The Panthers, led by eleventh year head coach Rob Jeter, played their home games at the UW–Milwaukee Panther Arena and the Klotsche Center and were members of the Horizon League. They finished the season 20–13, 10–8 in Horizon League play to finish in fifth place. They defeated Northern Kentucky in the first round of the Horizon League tournament to advance to the second round where they lost to Green Bay. Despite having 20 wins, they did not participate in a postseason tournament.

On March 17, head coach Rob Jeter was fired. He finished at Milwaukee with an 11-year record of 185–170.

Roster

Schedule

All conference games aired on the Horizon League website

|-
!colspan=9 style="background:#000000; color:#FDBB30;"| Exhibition

|-
!colspan=9 style="background:#000000; color:#FDBB30;"| Non-Conference regular season

|-
!colspan=9 style="background:#000000; color:#FDBB30;"| Horizon League regular season

|-
!colspan=9 style="background:#000000; color:#FDBB30;"|Horizon League tournament

|-

References

Milwaukee
Milwaukee Panthers men's basketball seasons